Hive (stylized as HIVE) is a custom ROM developed by Xolo and is built on the Android operating system v 4.4.4 (Kitkat). Hive is exclusive to Xolo devices and is not licensed to third-parties.

Hive was designed by Xolo's software design team at Bangalore. Users can interact with the development team and share ideas for new features. The Hive Development Team aims to release over-the-air updates with new features or bug fixes every fortnight.

The first Xolo device (8X-1000) with Hive was launched in August 2014.

Smartphones running Hive UI

Xolo 8X-1000
Xolo Omega 5.0
Xolo Omega 5.5
Xolo Black
Xolo Black 1X

See also
List of custom Android firmware

References

External links 

Custom Android firmware
Embedded Linux
Mobile Linux